is a song written by Akinori Nakagawa and was an ending theme of the Japanese TV program Sunday Japon.

Track listing

External links
Official Discography 

Akinori Nakagawa songs
2004 singles
Songs written by Akinori Nakagawa
2004 songs